Blood on the Bricks is the fourth studio album by Canadian singer, songwriter and multi-instrumentalist Aldo Nova, for which he signed to Jon Bon Jovi's Jambco Records.   It was his first album in 6 years.  The album featured fewer outside writers than his previous record, Twitch.  The songs were mostly written by Nova and Jon Bon Jovi, with help from Jim Vallance and Rick Hughes of Canadian metal band Sword.

Track listing 
 All songs written by Aldo Nova and Jon Bon Jovi, except where noted.	
 "Blood on the Bricks" – 4:54
 "Medicine Man"  – 4:49
 "Bang Bang"  – 4:27
 "Someday" (Bon Jovi, Rick Hughes, Nova) – 5:08
 "Young Love" (Bon Jovi, Nova, Jim Vallance) – 4:16
 "Modern World" – 4:33
 "This Ain't Love" – 5:05
 "Hey Ronnie (Veronica's Song)" – 4:45
 "Touch of Madness" – 4:24
 "Bright Lights" (Nova) – 6:20
 "Dance of the Dead"  -  4:14  (Japanese Bonus Track)

Reception 

Bret Adams of allmusic called the album "generally overproduced and noisy", saying that "most of the choruses are shout-along affairs." He ended his review by saying "Blood on the Bricks should have been better."  Author Martin Popoff called the album "kickin'", and characterized it as a comeback of sorts after a 6-year absence, stating Blood on the Bricks "proves you're never really washed-up for good unless you're six feet under, especially if you've got Jon Bon Jovi as a buddy."

Credits

Personnel 
 Aldo Nova - vocals, acoustic and electric guitars, organ, keyboards, programming
 Steve Segal - steel and slide guitar
 Greg Mathieson - Hammond organ
 Daniel Barbe - piano
 Randy Jackson - bass guitar
 Kenny Aronoff - drums
 Aldo Mazza - percussion
 Jon Bon Jovi, Alan Jordan, Kip Lennon, Rick Virag - backing vocals
 The No Sweat Horns - horn section

Production 
 Arranged and produced by Aldo Nova & Jon Bon Jovi
 Engineer: Rob Jacobs
 Assistant engineers: Nick DiDia, Steve Gallagher, Aldo Nova, Simon Pressey, Anthony Roberts
 Mixing: Nick DiDia, Rob Jacobs, Paul Lani
 Mastering: Bob Ludwig

References 

Aldo Nova albums
1991 albums
Albums produced by Aldo Nova